Ark is the sixth album by L'Arc-en-Ciel, released on July 1, 1999, simultaneously with Ray. It reached number one on the Oricon chart and sold over two million copies, being certified by the RIAJ.

Track listing

Personnel
 hyde – vocals
 ken – guitar, keyboards on tracks 1, 4, 5, 9 and 10, tambourine on tracks 2, 5 and 10, "Hong Kong handclaps" on track 5
 tetsu – bass guitar, backing vocals, keyboards on tracks 5, 8 and 11, metal percussion and "Hong Kong handclaps" on track 5
 yukihiro – drums, keyboards and turn table on track 4, "Hong Kong handclaps" on track 5
 Hajime Okano – keyboards on tracks 1, 2, 3, 4, 8, 9, 10 and 11, chromaharp on track 10
 Hitoshi Saitou – keyboards on all but track 9, piano on track 9
 Yukarie – tenor saxophone on track 2
 Smily – baritone saxophone on track 2
 Akatsuki Tada – trumpet on track 2
 Naoki Hirata – trumpet  on track 2
 Eishi Yoshizawa – organ and keyboards on track 3
 Chieko Kanehara – strings on track 7
 Keiko Abe – strings on track 11

References

1999 albums
L'Arc-en-Ciel albums